Fire Dragon (火雲傳奇) is a 1994 wuxia film with comedy and action elements, which features Brigitte Lin in the lead.

Plot
Ah Ha (Brigitte Lin) is an assassin known as Fire Dragon serving the evil Sixth Prince (Tan Lap-Man), who sent her on a mission to retrieve and destroy the incriminating letter but Yuen Ming (Max Mok), a wandering swordsman manages to save it. Both Yuen and Fire Dragon go undercover in a traveling acrobatic troupe led by Lyn Yu (Sandra Ng) while trying to draw each other out. However, when Ha becomes more involved with everyday people who welcome her into their homes, she transforms from a cold-hearted killer to a generous, heartwarming woman. The sixth prince, learning of the betrayal, orders her friend, Snow/Eagle Claw (Yeh Chuan-Chen) to kill Ha. Ha accidentally kills her in a duel, and is determined to stay with her good side. With some help from a couple of chilvarous friends, she rises up, set on attacking and defeating her former master.

Cast
Brigitte Lin as Ha/Fire Dragon
Max Mok Siu-Chung as Yuen Ming
Wu Gang as Zhen
Tan Lap-Man as Prince Wan
Sandra Ng as Tang Lyn Yu
Yeh Chuan-Chen	as Snow/Eagle Claw
Joe Chu as Rat

References

Fire Dragon at the Hong Kong Movie Database

External links 
 

1994 films
1990s Cantonese-language films
Hong Kong martial arts films
1990s action films
1990s Hong Kong films